Piaractus brachypomus, the pirapitinga, is a large species of pacu, a close relative of piranhas and silver dollars, in the serrasalmid family. It is native to the Amazon basin in tropical South America, but it formerly included populations in the Orinoco, which was described in 2019 as a separate species, P. orinoquensis. Additionally, P. brachypomus is widely farmed and has been introduced to other regions. In South Florida they are invasive in rivers, canals or lakes.

As with a number of other closely related species, P. brachypomus is often referred to as the red-bellied pacu in reference to the appearance of the juveniles. This has resulted in a great deal of confusion about the nature and needs of all the species involved, with the reputation and requirements of one frequently being wrongly attributed to the others.

Ecology

In general, its behavior resembles that of the closely-related tambaqui (Colossoma macropomum). It is migratory, but the pattern is poorly understood. Spawning occurs at the beginning of the flood season between November and February. Larvae of the pirapitinga are found in whitewater rivers, but adults mainly live in flooded forests and floodplains of various river types, including those of both nutrient-rich and nutrient-poor. Unlike the tambaqui, the pirapitinga also occurs in the headwaters of nutrient-poor rivers (not just in the lower sections).

It mainly feeds on fruits, seeds, and nuts, but it is opportunistic and will also take zooplankton, insects, crustaceans and small fish, especially in the dry season. In general, more seeds are able to pass undamaged through the pirapitinga than the tambaqui, meaning that the former is overall a more efficient seed disperser.

Appearance

Juveniles have a distinct red chest and stomach, and are easily confused with the carnivorous red-bellied piranha (Pygocentrus nattereri), but the two can be separated by their teeth, which are molar-like in Piaractus brachypomus. This similarity is believed to be Batesian mimicry by P. brachypomus in an attempt of avoiding predation by other species. Adults lack the bright red chest and belly, and resemble the tambaqui (Colossoma macropomum), but can be separated by several meristic and morphological features: The pirapitinga has a smaller adipose fin that lacks rays, as well as differences in teeth and operculum. The pirapitinga also has a more rounded head profile (less elongated and pointed). The other member of its genus, P. mesopotamicus, can be distinguished by its smaller scale-size and the higher number of lateral scales (more than 110).

Connection to humans
The pirapitinga supports major fisheries and based on a review by IBAMA, it was the 12th most caught fish by weight in the Brazilian Amazon in 1998 (just after the tambaqui).

The pirapitinga is often kept in aquaculture. Hybrids between this species and the tambaqui have been produced in aquaculture. It can also hybridize with P. orinoquensis, but the offspring appears to be sterile.

References

External links
http://www.aquaticcommunity.com/mix/redbellypacu.php
http://www.animalplanet.com/tv-shows/river-monsters/fish-guide/red-bellied-pacu/
http://eol.org/pages/217197/overview
Species Profile - Red-Bellied Pacu (Piaractus brachypomus), National Invasive Species Information Center, United States National Agricultural Library. 

Serrasalmidae
Fish described in 1818
Taxa named by Georges Cuvier